Give Me a Book of Complaints ( is a 1965 Soviet comedy film directed by Eldar Ryazanov.

Plot
A group of young journalists accidentally walks into the restaurant Dandelion. The atmosphere in the restaurant is extremely unhealthy: rude waitresses, thieving barmaid, wretched interior, ridiculous restaurant singer and deputy director Kutaytsev, who is constantly drunk and encourages this mess. However, the young and energetic director of the restaurant Tatiana Shumova is trying, unsuccessfully, to deal with shortcomings of the restaurant that she was entrusted with.

Journalist Yuri Nikitin wrote a critical article about the restaurant, but hopelessly falls in love with Tatiana. Despite the opposition of bureaucrats, the young director Shumova manages to change the situation, making the restaurant an exemplary catering establishment, as well as finding love along the way.

Cast

 Oleg Borisov as Yuri   Nikitin, journalist of the newspaper Youth
 Larisa Golubkina as Tatiana   Shumova, director of the restaurant Dandelion
 Anatoly Kuznetsov as Ivan Kondakov, head of the regional department of trade, Tatiana's bridegroom
 Anatoli Papanov as Vasily  Kutaytsev, deputy director of the restaurant  
 Nikolai Kryuchkov as Nikolay Ivanovich, head of department of trade
 Nikolai Parfenov as Ivan   Postnikov, deputy of head of department of trade
 Nina Agapova as barmaid Zinaida
 Tatyana Gavrilova as waitress Claudia Raspopova
 Natalia Surovegina as  young waitress Raya
 Zoya Isaeva as waitress Vera
 Rina Zelyonaya as elderly singer at the restaurant 
 Larisa Mondrus as new and young singer at the restaurant 
 Georgi Tusuzov as  Pavel   Kuzmich, doorman of the restaurant 
 Jemal Sikharulidze as Tengiz, journalist, Yuri Nikitin's friend
 Michaela Drozdovskaya as Masha, Tengiz's wife
 Yuri Belov as German, journalist, Yuri Nikitin's friend
 Vladimir Balon as  journalist, Yuri Nikitin's friend
 Felix Jaworski as bespectacled journalist
 Eldar Ryazanov as chief editor of the newspaper Youth
 Zoya Fyodorova as Yekaterina Ivanovna, janitor of  Tatiana Shumova's house
 Mikhail Pugovkin as Tatiana Shumova's neighbour
 Vladimir Shiryaev as Sasha, student
 Lyudmila Gnilova as Tamara, student
 Vera Popova as old lady
 Leonid Chubarov as policeman
 Alexander Lenkov as leader of the youth ensemble
 Yuri Nikulin as salesman in a clothing store, drunken rowdy to the restaurant 
 Georgy Vitsin as chief of the branch in a clothing store, drunken rowdy to the restaurant 
 Yevgeny Morgunov as director of clothing store, drunken rowdy to the restaurant

Facts 
The film sounds the Russian version of the song Cielito Lindo.

References

External links

1965 films
Soviet black-and-white films
1965 comedy films
Soviet comedy films
Russian comedy films
Films directed by Eldar Ryazanov
Films set in Moscow
Russian black-and-white films

Films set in restaurants
1960s Russian-language films